Ptychochromis grandidieri is a species of fish in the family Cichlidae endemic to river basins along a large part of the eastern coast of Madagascar, although it has been recorded as far as  inland. Uniquely in the genus Ptychochromis, this species also occurs in brackish water. It reaches 35cm in standard length. It shares a large part of its range with a cichlid from another genus, Paretroplus polyactis. The specific name honours Alfred Grandidier (1836-1921), the French naturalist and explorer who, with Henri Joseph Léon Humblot (1852-1914), collected the type.

References

grandidieri
Freshwater fish of Madagascar
Fish described in 1882
Taxa named by Henri Émile Sauvage
Taxonomy articles created by Polbot